The Academy of Canadian Cinema & Television's 14th Gemini Awards were held on November 7, 1999, to honour achievements in Canadian television. The awards show, which was hosted by Rick Mercer, took place at the Metro Toronto Convention Centre and was broadcast on CBC Television.

Awards

Best Dramatic Series
 Da Vinci's Inquest - Haddock Entertainment, Barna-Alper Productions, Alliance Atlantis Productions, Canadian Broadcasting Corporation. Producers: Chris Haddock, Laszlo Barna 
 More Tales of the City - Working Title Films. Producers: Kevin Tierney, Suzanne Girard, Alan Poul, Tim Bevan 
 Foolish Heart - Canadian Broadcasting Corporation. Producers: Ken Finkleman, Brian Dennis
 La Femme Nikita - Baton Broadcasting, Fireworks Entertainment. Producers: Jamie Paul Rock, Jay Firestone 
 Traders - Atlantis Films. Producers: Seaton McLean, Sandie Pereira, Peter Mitchell

Best TV Movie or Miniseries
 Milgaard - Barna-Alper Productions, Bar Harbour Films, Marble Island Pictures. Producers: Vibika Bianchi, Laszlo Barna, Richard Findlay, Martin Harbury, Laura Lightbown
 At the End of the Day: The Sue Rodriguez Story - Barna-Alper Productions, Atlantic Mediaworks. Producers: Laszlo Barna, Bob Miller, Sheldon Larry
 Happy Christmas, Miss King - Sullivan Entertainment. Producers: Kevin Sullivan, Trudy Grant 
 Justice - Alliance Atlantis Productions. Producers: Alyson Feltes, Brian Dennis, Seaton McLean
 Shot Through the Heart - Alliance Atlantis, BBC, Company Pictures, LeFrak Productions, Transatlantic Media Associates. Producers: Robert Lantos, Su Armstrong, Francine Lefrak, David M. Thompson

Best Comedy Program or Series
 Made in Canada - Salter Street Films, Island Edge. Producers: Marilyn Richardson, Gerald Lunz, Linda Nelson, Michael Donovan
 Double Exposure - CBC Radio One. Producers: Bob Robertson, Linda Cullen, Nick Orchard
 Comedy Now! - Elvira Kurt: Big Girl Now - CTV. Producers Trisa Dayot, Sandra Faire
 Air Farce Live - Canadian Broadcasting Corporation. Producers: Roger Abbott, Don Ferguson
 The Red Green Show - Red Green Productions. Producer: Steve Smith

Best Music, Variety Program or Series
 This Hour Has 22 Minutes New Year's Eve Special - Salter Street Films, Canadian Broadcasting Corporation.  Producers: Michael Donovan, Geoff D'Eon, Andrew McInnes, Jack Kellum, Paul Bellini
1998 True North Concert - Producers: Keith MacNeill, Steve Glassman, Jack Bond
History Bites - The History Channel. Producer: Rick Green
In Thru the Out Door - Canadian Broadcasting Corporation. Producer: Andy Nulman
Juno Awards of 1999 - Canadian Academy of Recording Arts and Sciences. Producers: Stephen Stohn, Lynn Harvey
West Coast Music Awards - Producer: Moyra Rodger

Best Performing Arts Program or Series, or Arts Documentary Program or Series

The Genius of Lenny Breau - Sleeping Giant Productions, Buffalo Gal Pictures. Producers: Jim Hanley, Phyllis Laing, Paul McConvey

Donald Brittain Award for Best Documentary Program
Crimes of Honor - Canadian Broadcasting Corporation, Bishari Films. Producer: Shelley Saywell
Believing - Producer: Nicole Lamothe
East Side Showdown - National Film Board of Canada. Producer: Peter Starr
Four Women of Egypt - National Film Board of Canada. Producer: Éric Michel
The Dragon's Egg - TVOntario. Producers: Elizabeth Yake, Allan King, Rudy Buttignol

Best Documentary Series
The View from Here - TVOntario. Producer: Rudy Buttignol
Man Alive - Canadian Broadcasting Corporation. Producers: Robin Christmas, Joy Crysdale
Rough Cuts - CBC Newsworld. Producers: Catherine Olsen, Tassie Notar, Jerry McIntosh
 The Cola Conquest - DLI Productions. Producers: Jan Rofekamp, Amy Webb, Abbey Neidik, Irene Angelico
 Witness - Canadian Broadcasting Corporation. Producers: Janice Tufford, Marie Natanson, Hilary Armstrong

Best History, Biography Documentary Program
Hitman Hart: Wrestling with Shadows - National Film Board of Canada, High Road Productions. Producers: Sally Blake, Paul Jay, Louise Lore, David M. Ostriker, Silva Basmajian, Rudy Buttignol
 Deadly Seas - Canadian Broadcasting Corporation. Producers: Mala Chapple, Michael Maclear
Gabrielle Roy - Buffalo Gal Pictures. Producers: Ian Boyd, Phyllis Laing
John McCrae's War: In Flanders Fields - National Film Board of Canada. Producers: Jonathan Desbarats, Barbara Shearer, Selwyn Jacob

Best Science, Technology, Nature, Environment or Adventure Documentary Program
My Healing Journey: Seven Years with Cancer - National Film Board of Canada. Producer: Jerry Krepakevich
Baboon Tales – Tamarin Productions. Producers: Gillian Darling-Kovanic, Rudolf Kovanic
 The Nature of Things - Up Close and Personal - Canadian Broadcasting Corporation. Producer: Caroline Underwood
 The Nature of Things - The Pill - Canadian Broadcasting Corporation. Producer: Joseph MacDonald
 Walking with Giants: The Grizzlies of Siberia - Rubin Tarrant Productions. Producer: Ian Herring

Best News Information Series
the fifth estate - Canadian Broadcasting Corporation. Producers: David Studer, Susan Teskey
 The Health Show - Canadian Broadcasting Corporation. Producer: Sophia Hadzipetros
The Magazine - CBC Newsworld. Producers: Janet Thomson, Kelly Crichton, Bob Bishop
W5 - CTV. Producers: Anton Koschany, Ian McLeod

Best Newscast/News Special
The National/CBC News - Swissair Disaster. Producers: Kelly Crichton, Hedy Korbee, Fred Parker (CBC)
CTV National News - Crisis in Kosovo. Producer: Henry Kowalski (CTV)
CTV National News - Shooting at Columbine High. Producer: Henry Kowalski, Robert Hurst (CTV)
CTV National News - Swissair Flight 111. Producer: Henry Kowalski (CTV)
The National/CBC News - Town Hall: Canada At War. Producers: Fred Parker, Mark Bulgutch, Chris Waddell (CBC)

Best Talk, Information Program or SeriesOpen Mike with Mike Bullard - The Comedy Network. Producers: Barbara Bowlby, Al Magee, John Brunton
Canada AM - CTV Television Network. Producers: Michael Serapio, Zev Shalev, Sean O'Malley
 Gzowski in Conversation - Canadian Broadcasting Corporation. Producers: Mary Young Leckie, Heather Haldane, Joan Tosoni
Hot Type - CBC Newsworld. Producers: Maria Mironowicz, Andrew Johnson
Imprint - TVOntario. Producers: Linda Dunlop, Richard Ouzounian

Best Lifestyle Information SeriesWeird Homes - Life Network, Homes II Productions, Yaletown Entertainment. Producer: Mike Collier
Country Canada - Canadian Broadcasting Corporation. Producer: Nigel Simms
 Fashion File - CBC Newsworld, Toronto Life Fashion Magazine. Producers: Debbie Gibson, Maria Mironowicz, Réjean Beaudin
Pet Project - Life Network. Producers: Dale Burshtein, Lon J. Hall
 Real Families - Life Network. Producers: Shoshana de Paz, Mark Ross
 Spilled Milk - Canadian Broadcasting Corporation. Producer: Melanie Wood

Best Animated Program or Series or Short Animated ProgramRolie Polie Olie - Nelvana, Métal Hurlant Productions. Producers: Michael Hirsh, Fabrice Giger, William Joyce, Patrick Loubert, Clive A. Smith
The Eye of the Wolf - CinéGroupe. Producer: Jacques Pettigrew
Snow Cat - National Film Board of Canada. Producers: Sheldon Cohen, Kenneth Hirsch, Marcy Page
Tongue Twister - Collideascope. Producers: Sean Scott, Steven J.P. Comeau, Michael-Andreas Kuttner
Twisteeria - Scintilla Entertainment. Producers: Pindar Azad, James C. McPhalen

Best Preschool Program or SeriesSesame Park - Canadian Broadcasting Corporation. Producers: Duncan Lamb, Susan Sheehan, Wendy Smith 
 Panda Bear Daycare - YTV, Radical Sheep Productions. Producers: John Leitch, Cheryl Wagner, Rob Mills
 Ruffus the Dog - YTV, Radical Sheep Productions. Producers: John Leitch, Cheryl Wagner, Rob Mills

Best Children's or Youth Program or Series
 The Inventors' Specials - The Inventors' Specials: Edison: The Wizard of Light - Devine Entertainment. Producers: David Devine, Richard Mozer
 Jenny and the Queen of Light - Breakthrough Entertainment. Producers: Andrea Boyd, Lawrence Zack, Peter Williamson, Ira Levy
 Yaa! To the M@X - YTV. Producers: Jonathan Finkelstein, Michel C. Lavoie, André Picard
 Goosebumps - Protocol Entertainment. Producers: Steven Levitan, Deborah Forte, Bill Siegler
 Incredible Story Studios - Mind's Eye Entertainment. Producers: Rob W. King, Virginia Thompson, Kevin DeWalt, Robert de Lint

Best Sports Program or SeriesThe New Ice Age: A Year in the Life of the NHL - Canadian Broadcasting Corporation, White Pine Pictures. Producers: Peter Raymont, Joseph Blasioli, Maria Pimentel
 Dave Hodge Special: The Three Nicest People in Sports - CBC Sports. Producer: Mitch Kerzner
Hockey Night in Canada - Maple Leaf Gardens: A Hockey Night in Canada Farewell - CBC Sports. Producers: Joel Darling, Paul Harrington
Olympic Warrior: Donovan Bailey's Story - CBC Sports. Producer: John Curtin
Sports Journal - CBC Sports. Producers: Brenda Irving, Claude Panet-Raymond, Tom Harrington, Ken Dodd

Best Live Sporting Event1998 Commonwealth Games - CBC Sports. Producers: Doug Sellars, Terry Ludwick 
1998 Export A Skins Golf - CBC Sports. Producers: Joel Darling, Jim Marshall
TSN World World Junior Hockey Final from Winnipeg - TSN. Producer: Rick Briggs-Jude

Best Live Special Event Coverage
 CBC Newsworld - Crash of Swissair 111 - CBC Newsworld. Producers: Mark Bulgutch, Brian Dubreuil, Dan Leger
 CBC Newsworld - Mandela and the Children - CBC Newsworld. Producers: Fred Parker, Mark Bulgutch, Chris Waddell
 CTV News 1: Tragedy in Taber - CTV News Channel. Producer: Tom Haberstroh
 CTV News Special Report: 1998 SCOC Ruling on Quebec Succession - CTV News. Producer: Tom Haberstroh, Robert Hurst
 @discovery.ca - John Glenn: Mission of Discovery: Live Special - Discovery Channel. Producers: Alex Bystram, Paul Lewis, Deanna Kraus

Best Direction in a Dramatic Program or Mini-SeriesStephen Williams - Milgaard (Barna-Alper Productions/Bar Harbour Films/Marble Island Pictures) 
 Gil Cardinal - Big Bear (Telefilm Canada/Productions Télé-Action/Kanata Productions)
 Stefan Scaini - Happy Christmas, Miss King (Sullivan Entertainment) 
 Raymond Saint-Jean - Out of Mind: The Stories of H. P. Lovecraft (Cine Qua Non Films)
Tim Southam - The Tale of Teeka (Galafilm/Triptych Media)

Best Direction in a Dramatic SeriesKen Finkleman - Foolish Heart - Breathless (CBC)
 George Bloomfield - Due South - Dead Guy Running (Alliance Films)
 Chris Bould - Emily of New Moon - Pins and Needles, Needles and Pins, When a Man Gets Married, His Trouble Begins (Salter Street Films/Cinar)
John Fawcett - Power Play (CTV Originals/NDG Productions/Serendipity Point Films/Alliance Atlantis)
T. W. Peacocke - Traders (Atlantis Films)

Best Direction in a Variety, or Performing Arts Program or Series
 Henry Sarwer-Foner - This Hour Has 22 Minutes New Year's Eve Special (Salter Street Films/CBC) 
Judy Jackson, Serge Turbide - Beauty for Ashes: Artists and Human Rights
Laura Taler, Moze Mossanen - Dances for a Small Screen (Taler Group/Triptych Media, Hammond Associates)
Michael McNamara - In Thru the Out Door (Showtime)
Robert Crossman - Water, Earth, Air, Fire (BravoFACT/Paulus Productions)

Best Direction in an Information Program or SeriesNeil Docherty - the fifth estate - Bad Blood (CBC) 
 David Storey - Pet Project (Life Network)
 Ramelle Mair, Serge Marcil, Sid Goldberg, Jean Louis Côté - Popular Mechanics For Kids (SDA Productions)
Michael Prini – Savoir Faire (Primevista Television) 
 Linda McEwan - The Health Show (CBC)

Best Direction in a Documentary Program or SeriesJoseph Viszmeg - My Healing Journey: Seven Years with Cancer (NFB)
Patricio Guzmán - Chile, Obstinate Memory (NFB)
Barry Greenwald - High Risk Offender (NFB)
Paul Jay - Hitman Hart: Wrestling with Shadows (National Film Board of Canada/High Road Productions)
Jane Armstrong - Nuclear Sharks (Discovery Channel)
 Maurice Bulbulian - The Nitinaht Chronicles (NFB)

Best Direction in a Comedy Program or Series
 Henry Sarwer-Foner - Made in Canada - And the Winner is… (Salter Street Films, Island Edge) 
Giles Walker - Dooley Gardens (CBC)
Ray Hagel - The Tom Green Show (The Comedy Network)
Henry Sarwer-Foner - This Hour Has 22 Minutes (Salter Street Films/CBC) 
Andrew Currie - Twisteeria (Scintilla Entertainment)

Best Writing in a Dramatic Program or Miniseries
 Gordon Pinsent - Win, Again! (CBC)
 Linda Svendsen - At the End of the Day: The Sue Rodriguez Story (Barna-Alper Productions, Atlantic Mediaworks)
 Andrew Wreggitt - In the Blue Ground (Alberta Filmworks)
 Alan Di Fiore, Keith Ross Leckie - Milgaard (Barna-Alper Productions/Bar Harbour Films/Marble Island Pictures)
 Moze Mossanen - My Gentleman Friends (Bravo!)

Best Writing in a Dramatic Series
 Chris Haddock, Leonel Luna - Da Vinci's Inquest - The Quality of Mercy (Haddock Entertainment/Barna-Alper Productions/Alliance Atlantis Productions/CBC)
 Chris Haddock, Larry Campbell, Esta Spalding - Da Vinci's Inquest (Haddock Entertainment/Barna-Alper Productions/Alliance Atlantis Productions/Canadian Broadcasting Corporation)
Ken Finkleman - Foolish Heart - The Correct Decision (CBC)
Paul Aitken, Peter Mitchell - Traders (Atlantis Films)

Best Writing in a Comedy or Variety Program or Series
 Cathy Jones, Mark Farrell, Ron James, Chris Finn, Edward Kay, Rick Mercer, Tim Steeves, Greg Thomey, Mary Walsh - This Hour Has 22 Minutes New Year's Eve Special (Salter Street Films/CBC) 
David Fine - Bob and Margaret (Nelvana)
 Rick Mercer, Mark Farrell - Made in Canada (Salter Street Films/Island Edge)
Gord Oxley, Paul O'Sullivan, Jonathan Crombie, Lisa Lambert, Bob Martin - SketchCom (CBC)
 Bruce Pirrie, Bob Bainborough, Steve Smith, Rick Green, Shaun Graham - The Red Green Show (Red Green Productions)

Best Writing in an Information Program or Series
 Clifton Joseph - Undercurrents - Snow Job (CBC)
 Joe Schlesinger - Schlesinger (CBC)
Brenda Irving - Sports Journal (CBC Sports)
 Francine Pelletier - the fifth estate (CBC)
 Brian Stewart - The Magazine (CBC Newsworld)
 Catherine Legge - Undercurrents (CBC)

Best Writing in a Documentary Program or Series
 Paul Cowan, Irene Angelico, Howard Goldberg - The Cola Conquest - The Big Sell (DLI Productions)
Chris Mullington - Man Alive - Beyond Belief (CBC)
Monty Bassett - Life on the Vertical (Out Yonder Films)
Joseph Viszmeg - My Healing Journey: Seven Years with Cancer (NFB)
 Nadine Pequeneza - Turning Points of History (The History Channel)
 Alan Mendelsohn - Turning Points of History (The History Channel)

Best Writing in a Children's or Youth Program
 Peter Sauder, Ian James Corlett - Rolie Polie Olie - Roll the Camera (Nelvana/Métal Hurlant Productions)
 Dennis Foon - Jenny and the Queen of Light (Breakthrough Entertainment)
 John Pellatt, Kenn Scott - Ned's Newt – Back To the Futile (Nelvana/TMO Film GmbH)
 Vicki Grant - Scoop and Doozie (Queen Bee Productions)
 Louise Moon - Street Cents (CBC)

Best Performance by an Actor in a Leading Role in a Dramatic Program or Miniseries
 Ian Tracey - Milgaard (Barna-Alper Productions/Bar Harbour Films/Marble Island Pictures) 
Stephen McHattie - American Whiskey Bar (Citytv/Shadow Shows)
 Henry Czerny - The Girl Next Door (FTM Productions/Shostak-Rossner Productions/World International Network)
 Peter Kelly Gaudreault - In the Blue Ground (Alberta Filmworks)
 Gordon Pinsent - Win, Again! (CBC)

Best Performance by an Actress in a Leading Role in a Dramatic Program or Miniseries
 Wendy Crewson - At the End of the Day: The Sue Rodriguez Story (Barna-Alper Productions/Atlantic Mediaworks)
 Polly Shannon - The Girl Next Door (FTM Productions/Shostak-Rossner Productions/World International Network)
 Julie Khaner - Justice (Alliance Atlantis Productions)
 Gabrielle Rose - Milgaard (Barna-Alper Productions/Bar Harbour Films/Marble Island Pictures) 
 Gabrielle Rose - Win, Again! (CBC)

Best Performance by an Actor in a Continuing Leading Dramatic Role
 Michael Riley - Power Play – Seventh Game (CTV Originals/NDG Productions/Serendipity Point Films/Alliance Atlantis)
 Donnelly Rhodes - Da Vinci's Inquest (Haddock Entertainment/Barna-Alper Productions/Alliance Atlantis Productions/Canadian Broadcasting Corporation
 Paul Gross - Due South (Alliance Films)
 Callum Keith Rennie - Due South – Ladies Man (Alliance Films)
 John Neville - Emily of New Moon (Salter Street Films/Cinar)
Michael Easton - Total Recall 2070 (ONtv/Alliance Atlantis)

Best Performance by an Actress in a Continuing Leading Dramatic Role
 Arsinée Khanjian - Foolish Heart - Lena (CBC)
 Rebecca Jenkins - Black Harbour (Fogbound Films/Topsail Entertainment)
 Sheila McCarthy - Emily of New Moon (Salter Street Films/Cinar)
 Peta Wilson - La Femme Nikita (Baton Broadcasting/Fireworks Entertainment)
 Sonja Smits - Traders (Atlantis Films)
 Kathy Greenwood - Wind at My Back - Marathon (CBC)

Best Performance by an Actor in a Guest Role Dramatic Series
 Sean McCann - Power Play - Perambulate Me Back To My Habitual Abode (CTV Originals/NDG Productions/Serendipity Point Films/Alliance Atlantis)
 Morris Panych - Cold Squad - Season II (Keatley MacLeod Productions/Atlantis Films)
 Timothy Webber - Cold Squad - Season II (Keatley MacLeod Productions/Atlantis Films)
 Jan Rubeš - The City (Sarrazin Couture Entertainment)
 Gordon Pinsent - Wind at My Back - Season II (CBC)

Best Performance by an Actress in a Guest Role Dramatic Series
 Martha Henry - Emily of New Moon – The Book Of Hours (Salter Street Films/Cinar)
 Gabrielle Miller - Da Vinci's Inquest (Haddock Entertainment/Barna-Alper Productions/Alliance Atlantis Productions/Canadian Broadcasting Corporation
 Salome Bey - Due South (Alliance Films)
 Sarah Strange - Nothing Too Good for a Cowboy (Alliance Communications, Milestone Productions)
 Enuka Okuma - Traders (Atlantis Films)

Best Performance by an Actor in a Featured Supporting Role in a Dramatic Program or Miniseries
 Hrothgar Mathews - Milgaard (Barna-Alper Productions/Bar Harbour Films/Marble Island Pictures) 
 Jaimz Woolvett - Milgaard (Barna-Alper Productions/Bar Harbour Films/Marble Island Pictures) 
 Garwin Sanford - Milgaard (Barna-Alper Productions/Bar Harbour Films/Marble Island Pictures) 
Kenneth Welsh - Scandalous Me: The Jacqueline Susann Story (Alliance Atlantis Productions)
 Michael Riley - Win, Again! (CBC)

Best Performance by an Actress in a Featured Supporting Role in a Dramatic Program or Miniseries
 Sabrina Grdevich - Milgaard (Barna-Alper Productions/Bar Harbour Films/Marble Island Pictures) 
 Mag Ruffman - Happy Christmas, Miss King (Sullivan Entertainment) 
 Deanna Milligan - Justice (Alliance Atlantis Productions)
 Shannon Lawson - Sleeping Dogs Lie (Sullivan Entertainment)
 Leah Pinsent - Win, Again! (CBC)

Best Performance by an Actor in a Featured Supporting Role in a Dramatic Series
 Gordon Pinsent - Power Play - Perambulate Me Back To My Habitual Abode (CTV Originals/NDG Productions/Serendipity Point Films/Alliance Atlantis)
 Timothy Webber - Black Harbour (Fogbound Films/Topsail Entertainment)
 Peter Blais - Psi Factor: Chronicles of the Paranormal (Atlantis Films/Alliance Atlantis)
 Shawn Doyle - The City (Sarrazin Couture Entertainment)
 Michael Sarrazin - The City (Sarrazin Couture Entertainment)

Best Performance by an Actress in a Featured Supporting Role in a Dramatic Series
 Marion Gilsenan - Riverdale (Epitome Pictures)
 Jackie Burroughs - More Tales of the City – (Working Title Films)
 Ramona Milano - Due South (Alliance Films)
 Sarah Strange - Foolish Heart - Lena (CBC)
Caterina Scorsone - Power Play (CTV Originals/NDG Productions/Serendipity Point Films/Alliance Atlantis)

Best Performance in a Comedy Program or Series
 Cathy Jones, Rick Mercer, Greg Thomey, Mary Walsh - This Hour Has 22 Minutes - Warrior Princess/Mike Harris/Talking To Americans (Salter Street Films/CBC) 
Shaun Majumder - Comedy Now! (CTV)
Bob Robertson, Linda Cullen - Double Exposure (CBC Radio One)
 Leah Pinsent, Peter Keleghan, Dan Lett, Rick Mercer - Made in Canada - A Death in the Family (Salter Street Films, Island Edge)
Tom Green - The Tom Green Show (The Comedy Network)

Best Performance or Host in a Variety Program or Series
 Jesse Cook, Natalie MacMaster - Juno Awards of 1999 (Canadian Academy of Recording Arts and Sciences)
Ginette Reno - 19th Genie Awards (Academy of Canadian Cinema & Television)
Bruno Pelletier - Juno Awards of 1999 (Canadian Academy of Recording Arts and Sciences)
John Rogers - Just for Laughs (Just for Laughs Comedy Festival)
Seán Cullen - Comedy Now! - Seán Cullen: Wood, Cheese and Children (CTV)

Best Performance in a Performing Arts Program or Series
 Joni Mitchell - Joni Mitchell: Painting With Words and Music (Insight Productions)
José Navas - Dances for a Small Screen (Taler Group/Triptych Media/Hammond Associates)
Karen Kain - Karen Kain: Dancing In The Moment (CBC)
Angela Song - Variations on a New Generation

Best Performance in a Preschool Program or Series
 Jayne Eastwood - Noddy - The Trouble with Truman (Catalyst Entertainment) 
Sean McCann - Noddy (Catalyst Entertainment) 
Rob Mills - Ruffus the Dog (YTV/Radical Sheep Productions)
James Rankin - Scoop and Doozie (Queen Bee Productions)
Bob Stutt - Sesame Park (CBC)

Best Performance in a Children's or Youth Program or Series
 Meredith Henderson - The Adventures of Shirley Holmes - The Case of the Crooked Comic (Credo Entertainment/Forefront Entertainment)
 Jonathan Torrens - Jonovision (CBC)
Corey Sevier - Lassie (YTV/Cinar)
Maurice Dean Wint - The Sweetest Gift (Hallmark Entertainment/Temple Street Productions/Showtime)
Brent Carver - Whiskers (Les Productions La Fête/Showtime)

Best News Anchor
 Peter Mansbridge - The National/CBC News (CBC)
 Gloria Macarenko - Broadcast One - Swissair Crash/Nisga'a Debate
 Lisa LaFlamme - CTV National News - Shooting at Columbine High/Tragedy in Taber

Best Reportage
 Tom Kennedy - The National/CBC News - Shelter Blast (CBC)
Paula Newton - CTV National News - Kosovo Refugees (CTV)
Tom Walters - CTV National News - Swissair Flight 111 (CTV)
Tom Clark - CTV National News - Target Belgrade (CTV)
Avis Favaro - CTV National News - Whistleblower Doctor (CTV)

Best Information Segment
 Tracie Tighe, Steve Tonon - Venture - King of the Hill (CBC)
 David Joy, Jonathan Craven - On the Road Again (CBC Television)
 Jeff Hodges, Catherine Annau - Studio 2 - Power Refugees (TVOntario)
 Carmen Merrifield, Anna Maria Tremonti - The Magazine (CBC Newsworld)
 Wendy Trueman, Wei Chen - W5 - A Wing & A Prayer (CTV)
 Wendy Trueman, Wei Chen - W5 - Life & Death (CTV)
 Gerry Wagschal, Jim O'Connell - W5 - Buyer Beware (CTV)

Best Host or Interviewer in a News or Talk/General Information Program or Series
 Wendy Mesley - Undercurrents - Stacking the Deck/Pushing Pills/Speech Circuit (CBC)
Ralph Benmergui - Benmergui Live (CBC Newsworld)
Avi Lewis - CounterSpin (CBC Newsworld)
Alison Smith - World Report (CBC Newsworld)
 Linden MacIntyre - the fifth estate (CBC)
 David Suzuki - The Nature of Things (CBC)

Best Host in a Lifestyle/Practical Information, or Performing Arts Program or Series
 Brian Linehan - Linehan - Judy Collins/Wendy Crewson/James Woods (Electric Entertainment)
 Kevin Brauch - Canadian Gardening, Season III (Corus Entertainment)
 Wayne Rostad - On the Road Again (CBC Television)
 Kevin Frank - Pet Project - (Life Network)
 Ken Kostick - What's for Dinner? (Breakthrough Entertainment)
 Mary Jo Eustace - What's for Dinner? (Breakthrough Entertainment)

Best Sportscaster
 Chris Cuthbert - CFL on CBC (CBC Sports)
Ron MacLean - 1998 Commonwealth Games (CBC Sports)
 Brian Williams - 1998 Molson Indy Toronto (CBC Sports)
Vic Rauter - TSN Championship Curling - The Labatt Brier Semi-Final (TSN)
Jim Van Horne - SportsCentre (TSN)

Best Photography in a Dramatic Program or Series
 Derick Underschultz - Total Recall 2070 - Restitution (ONtv/Alliance Atlantis)
 Steve Danyluk - Emily of New Moon (Salter Street Films/Cinar)
Michael McMurray - Earth: Final Conflict (Atlantis Films)
 Laszlo George - Scandalous Me: The Jacqueline Susann Story (Alliance Atlantis Productions)
 Robert Saad - Sleeping Dogs Lie (Sullivan Entertainment)

Best Photography in a Comedy, Variety, Performing Arts Program or Series
 David A. Greene - Water, Earth, Air, Fire - Dragon Tango (BravoFACT/Paulus Productions)
 David A. Greene - La Danza - Quartetto Gelato  (Quartetto Gelato)
 Dennis Jones - The 1998 Canadian Country Music Awards (Canadian Country Music Association)

Best Photography in an Information Program or Series
 Paul Freer - W5 - A Wing & A Prayer (CTV)
Willie Lypko - Vantage Women of Originality Awards (Jann Arden/Universal Concerts)
Wayne Abbott - Vantage Women of Originality Awards (Jann Arden/Universal Concerts)
Colin Allison - the fifth estate - CBC
Stephane Brisson - CTV National News - Library Lifesavers (CTV)
Ross MacIntosh - CTV National News - Deadly Detergents (CTV)

Best Photography in a Documentary Program or SeriesGerman Gutierrez, Claude-Julie Parisot - Insectia - Wicked Butterflies (Pixcom/Cineteve/Discovery Channel)
 Rudolf Kovanic - Baboon Tales (Tamarin Productions)
John Westheuser - East Side Showdown (NFB)
Richard Stringer - Exhibit A: Secrets of Forensic Science - Season 2 (Kensington Communications)
 Robert Melichar - Forbidden Places (MapleRock Entertainment)

Best Visual EffectsJon Campfens, Barb Benoit, John Cox, Mark Savela - Due South - Call of the Wild Part 2 (Alliance Films)
 Gary Mueller - Lexx - The Net (Salter Street Films/CHUM Television)
Jon Campfens, David Alexander, Van LaPointe, Joel Skeete - Total Recall 2070 - Machine Dreams (ONtv/Alliance Atlantis)
Jon Campfens, David Alexander, Ray Caesar, Dug Claxton - Total Recall 2070 - Brain Fever (ONtv/Alliance Atlantis)
Peter Mastalyr, Bernie Melanson, Paul Cox, Robert Appleby, Rob Egan - Twisteeria (Scintilla Entertainment)

Best Picture Editing in a Dramatic Program or SeriesRalph Brunjes - Milgaard (Barna-Alper Productions/Bar Harbour Films/Marble Island Pictures) 
Allan Lee - Da Vinci's Inquest (Haddock Entertainment, Barna-Alper Productions, Alliance Atlantis Productions, CBC)
Dean Evans - Incredible Story Studios (Mind's Eye Entertainment)
Daria Ellerman - Stargate SG-1 (Stargate SG-1 Productions)
André Corriveau - The Tale of Teeka (Galafilm/Triptych Media)

Best Picture Editing in an Information Program or SeriesLeslie Steven Onody - the fifth estate - Bad Blood (CBC) 
Roger Lefebvre - On the Road Again (CBC Television)
Zsolt Luka, Jason Levy - Popular Mechanics For Kids (SDA Productions) 
Steve Tonon - Venture (CBC)
Andre Lapalme - W5 - A Game of Risk (CTV)
Steve Thomson - Venture (CBC)

Best Picture Editing in a Documentary Program or SeriesManfred Becker - Hitman Hart: Wrestling with Shadows (NFB, High Road Productions)
Giorgio Saturnino - The Bunny Years (Upfront Entertainment)
Nick Hector - The Dragon's Egg (TVOntario)
Shelly Hamer - Baboon Tales (Tamarin Productions)
Dominique Champagne - Killer Cults 
Hélène Girard - Chile, Obstinate Memory (NFB)

Best Picture Editing in a Comedy, Variety, Performing Arts Program or SeriesVesna Svilanovic - Dances for a Small Screen (Taler Group/Triptych Media/Hammond Associates)
 Jack Walker – Cynthia (CBC)
Aaron Woodley - La Danza - Quartetto Gelato (Quartetto Gelato)
Allan Maclean, Todd Foster, Keith Bradley, Eric Campbell, Gregg Antworth - This Hour Has 22 Minutes New Year's Eve Special (Salter Street Films/CBC) 
Aaron Woodley - Water, Earth, Air, Fire (BravoFACT/Paulus Productions)

Best Production Design or Art Direction in a Dramatic Program or SeriesKatterina Keith, Ian Nothnagel - Dead Man's Gun - My Brother's Keeper (Vidatron Entertainment Group) 
Sandra Kybartas, Armando Sgrignuoli - Due South - Call of the Wild Part 2 (Alliance Films)
 Don McEwen, Zoe Sakellaropoulo, Dan Owens, Perri Gorrara - Emily of New Moon (Salter Street Films/Cinar)
 Alan MacLeod, Graeme Morphy - Pit Pony (Cochran Entertainment)
 Barbara Dunphy - Shot Through the Heart (Alliance Atlantis/BBC/Company Pictures/LeFrak Productions/Transatlantic Media Associates)

Best Production Design or Art Direction in a Non-Dramatic Program or SeriesBrian Perchaluk - Journey: A Mythical Dance Fantasy (Caplette-Paquin Productions)
 Lloyd Brown, Andrew Kinsella - Cynthia (CBC)
 Tom Anthes - The Bette Show (Salter Street Films)
 Stephen Osler, Tom Anthes - This Hour Has 22 Minutes New Year's Eve Special (Salter Street Films/CBC) 
 Steve Osborne, Danny Chan - West Coast Music Awards

Best Costume DesignNicoletta Massone - Big Bear (Telefilm Canada/Productions Télé-Action/Kanata Productions)
 Kate Rose - Emily of New Moon (Salter Street Films/Cinar)
Ruth Secord - Happy Christmas, Miss King (Sullivan Entertainment)
Laurie Drew - La Femme Nikita (Baton Broadcasting/Fireworks Entertainment)
Lorraine Carson - Nothing Too Good for a Cowboy (Alliance Communications/Milestone Productions)
Ruth Secord - Sleeping Dogs Lie (Sullivan Entertainment)

Best Achievement in MakeupPierre Saindon - Big Bear (Telefilm Canada/Productions Télé-Action/Kanata Productions)
Susan Exton-Stranks, Marilyn O'Quinn - Justice (Alliance Atlantis Productions)
Monica Huppert, Jan Newman, David Dupuis, Adam Behr - Stargate SG-1 - Holiday (Stargate SG-1 Productions)
 Jayne Dancose, Gitte Axen, Tibor Farkas, Fay von Schroeder - The Outer Limits (Atlantis Films/Trilogy Entertainment)
Marilyn O'Quinn, Gordon J. Smith - Total Recall 2070 (ONtv/Alliance Atlantis)

Best Overall Sound in a Dramatic Program or SeriesAllen Ormerod, Steve Baine, Scott Shepherd, John Thomson - Total Recall 2070 - Machine Dreams Part 1 (ONtv/Alliance Atlantis)
 Sebastian Salm, Paul A. Sharpe, Jim Eustace, John Sievert, Dean Giammarco - Da Vinci's Inquest -The Hunt (Haddock Entertainment/Barna-Alper Productions/Alliance Atlantis/CBC)
Steve Baine, Scott Shepherd, Allen Ormerod, Daniel Latour - La Femme Nikita (Baton Broadcasting/Fireworks Entertainment)
Marcel Duperreault, Jason Frederickson, Todd Araki, Kirk Furniss - Shadow Raiders (Mainframe Entertainment)
 Guy Francoeur, Bruno Ruffolo, Serge Beauchemin, Luc Boudrias - The Tale of Teeka (Galafilm/Triptych Media)

Best Sound in a Comedy, Variety, or Performing Arts Program or SeriesRon Searles – Karen Kain: Dancing In The Moment (CBC)
Floyd Burrell, Ron Searles, Peter Campbell, Ian Dunbar, Simon Bowers - Cynthia (CBC)
 Joni Mitchell, Simon Bowers - Joni Mitchell: Painting With Words and Music (Insight Productions)
 Doug McClement, Ian Dunbar, Howard Baggley, Peter Mann, Simon Bowers - Juno Awards of 1999 - (Canadian Academy of Recording Arts and Sciences)
 Wayne Kozak - Twisteeria (Scintilla Entertainment)

Best Sound in an Information/Documentary Program or SeriesSteven Gurman, Richard Betanzos, Cory Rizos - The War of 1812 - Or Leave Our Bones Upon Them (Galafilm)
James Ho Lim, Damian Kearns, Ian Challis - Life and Times - Lorne Greene (CBC)
George Brook, Andrew Huggett, Colin Savage Schlachta - North-West Mounted Police - The Great March (GAPC Entertainment)
Christopher T. Welch, Elma Bello, Alison Clark - The Nature of Things – Dead Heat (CBC)
 Daniel Pellerin, Sue Conley, Keith Elliott, Gary Bruckner, Stephen Barden, Mark Zsifkovits, Rob Wright - The View from Here (TVOntario)

Best Sound Editing in a Dramatic Program or SeriesStephen Barden, Joe Bracciale, Craig Henighan, E. Angie Pajek - Total Recall 2070 - Machine Dreams Part 1 (ONtv/Alliance Atlantis)
John Douglas Smith, Tom Bjelic, Richard Harkness - Earth: Final Conflict (Atlantis Films)
Marc Perlman, Ken Cade, Brian Campbell, Real Gauvreau - The Outer Limits (Atlantis Films/Trilogy Entertainment)
Jane Tattersall, Julie Saragosa, Fred Brennan, Mark Shnuriwsky, Michele Cook - Da Vinci's Inquest -The Hunt (Haddock Entertainment/Barna-Alper Productions/Alliance Atlantis/CBC
Dan Sexton, Danielle McBride, Steve Gorman - Milgaard (Barna-Alper Productions/Bar Harbour Films/Marble Island Pictures)

Best Original Music Score for a Program or MiniseriesGaetan Gravel, Serge Laforest - Out of Mind: The Stories of H. P. Lovecraft (Cine Qua Non Films)
 Clode Hamelin - Big Bear (Telefilm Canada/Productions Télé-Action/Kanata Productions)
Jonathan Goldsmith - The Girl Next Door (FTM Productions/Shostak-Rossner Productions, World International Network)
 Lou Pomanti - The Inventors' Specials - The Inventors' Specials: Edison: The Wizard of Light (Devine Entertainment)
 John Welsman - Marie Curie: More Than Meets the Eye (Devine Entertainment)
 Mark Korven - Win, Again! (CBC)

Best Original Music Score for a Dramatic SeriesTom Thorney, Brent Barkman, Pete Coulman, Carl Lenox, Tim Thorney - Rolie Polie Olie (Nelvana/Métal Hurlant Productions)
Christopher Dedrick - Emily of New Moon (Salter Street Films/Cinar)
Claude Foisy - First Wave (Sugar Entertainment/American Zoetrope)
Rob Bryanton, Jack Semple - Incredible Story Studios - Mars Attack (Mind's Eye Entertainment)
 Zoran Boris - Total Recall 2070 (ONtv/Alliance Atlantis)
Rob Bryanton - Incredible Story Studios – Dirty Pool (Mind's Eye Entertainment)

Best Original Music Score for a Documentary Program or SeriesMark Korven''' - A Scattering of Seeds: The Creation of Canada - First Lady of the Yukon: Martha Black (White Pine Pictures)
 Edmund Eagan - Man Alive (CBC)
 Fred Mollin - Exhibit A: Secrets of Forensic Science - Season 2 (Kensington Communications)
John Sereda - John McCrae's War: In Flanders Fields (NFB)
Andrew Huggett - North-West Mounted Police (GAPC Entertainment)
 Ken Myhr - The Nature of Things - Dead Heat (Canadian Broadcasting Corporation)

Special Awards
Gordon Sinclair Award For Broadcast Journalism - David Studer
John Drainie Award - Pierre Berton
Earle Grey Award - Jayne Eastwood
Margaret Collier Award - Suzette Couture
Gemini Award for Outstanding Technical Achievement - Bell TV
Canada Award – Lesley Ann Patten, Kent Martin - LoyaltiesAcademy Achievement Award – Gordon Craig
Chrysler's Canada's Choice Award - Frank Siracusa, David Cole, Paul Gross, R.B. Carney - Due South''

Citations 

Gemini Awards
Gemini Awards, 1999
Gemini Awards